Romantic music is a stylistic movement in Western Classical music associated with the period of the 19th century commonly referred to as the Romantic era (or Romantic period). It is closely related to the broader concept of Romanticism—the intellectual, artistic and literary movement that became prominent in Western culture from approximately 1798 until 1837.

Romantic composers sought to create music that was individualistic, emotional, dramatic and often programmatic; reflecting broader trends within the movements of Romantic literature, poetry, art, and philosophy. Romantic music was often ostensibly inspired by (or else sought to evoke) non-musical stimuli, such as nature, literature, poetry, super-natural elements or the fine arts. It included features such as increased chromaticism and moved away from traditional forms.

Background

The Romantic movement was an artistic, literary, and intellectual movement that originated in the second half of the 18th century in Europe and strengthened in reaction to the Industrial Revolution. In part, it was a revolt against social and political norms of the Age of Enlightenment and a reaction against the scientific rationalization of nature . It was embodied most strongly in the visual arts, music, literature, and education, and was in turn influenced by developments in natural history.

One of the first significant applications of the term to music was in 1789, in the Mémoires by the Frenchman André Grétry, but it was E. T. A. Hoffmann who established the principles of musical romanticism, in a lengthy review of Ludwig van Beethoven's Fifth Symphony published in 1810, and an 1813 article on Beethoven's instrumental music. In the first of these essays Hoffmann traced the beginnings of musical Romanticism to the later works of Haydn and Mozart. It was Hoffmann's fusion of ideas already associated with the term "Romantic", used in opposition to the restraint and formality of Classical models, that elevated music, and especially instrumental music, to a position of pre-eminence in Romanticism as the art most suited to the expression of emotions. It was also through the writings of Hoffmann and other German authors that German music was brought to the center of musical Romanticism.

Composers 
Ludwig van Beethoven is considered one of the transitioning composers bridging the Classical era and the Romantic era. Other influential composers of the early Romantic era include Hector Berlioz, Frédéric Chopin, Fanny Mendelssohn, Felix Mendelssohn, Gioachino Rossini, Vincenzo Bellini, Gaetano Donizetti, Niccolò Paganini, Franz Schubert, Clara Schumann, Robert Schumann, Heinrich Marschner and Carl Maria von Weber.

Later nineteenth-century composers would appear to build upon certain early Romantic ideas and musical techniques, such as the use of extended chromatic harmony and expanded orchestration. Such later Romantic composers include Anton Bruckner, Johannes Brahms, Pyotr Ilyich Tchaikovsky, Mykola Lysenko, Modest Mussorgsky, Antonín Dvořák, Alexander Borodin, Franz Liszt, Richard Wagner, Gustav Mahler, Richard Strauss, Giuseppe Verdi, Giacomo Puccini, Nikolai Rimsky-Korsakov, Alexander Glazunov, Edward Elgar, Edvard Grieg, Gabriel Fauré, and Sergei Rachmaninoff.

Traits
The classical period often used short, even fragmentary, thematic material while the Romantic period tended to make greater use of longer, more fully defined and more emotionally evocative themes.

Characteristics often attributed to Romanticism:

 a new preoccupation with and surrender to nature;
a turn towards the mystic and supernatural, both religious and unearthly;
a focus on the nocturnal, the ghostly, the frightful, and terrifying;
a new attention given to national identity;
discontent with musical formulas and conventions;
a greater emphasis on melody to sustain musical interest;
increased chromaticism;
a harmonic structure based on movement from tonic to subdominant or alternative keys rather than the traditional dominant, and use of more elaborate harmonic progressions (Wagner and Liszt are known for their experimental progressions);
large, grand orchestras were common during this period;
increase in virtuosic players featured in orchestrations;
the use of new or previously not so common musical structures like the song cycle, nocturne, concert etude, arabesque and rhapsody, alongside the traditional classical genres;
Program music became somewhat more common;
the use of a wider range of dynamics, for example from ppp to fff, supported by large orchestration;
a greater tonal range (exp. using the lowest and highest notes of the piano);

In music, there is a relatively clear dividing line in musical structure and form following the death of Beethoven. Whether one counts Beethoven as a "romantic" composer or not, the breadth and power of his work gave rise to a feeling that the classical sonata form and, indeed, the structure of the symphony, sonata and string quartet had been exhausted.

Trends of the 19th century

Non-musical influences 
Events and changes in society such as ideas, attitudes, discoveries, inventions, and historical events often affect music. For example, the Industrial Revolution was in full effect by the late 18th century and early 19th century. This event profoundly affected music: there were major improvements in the mechanical valves and keys that most woodwinds and brass instruments depend on. The new and innovative instruments could be played with greater ease and they were more reliable.

Another development that affected music was the rise of the middle class.  Composers before this period lived under the patronage of the aristocracy. Many times their audience was small, composed mostly of the upper class and individuals who were knowledgeable about music. The Romantic composers, on the other hand, often wrote for public concerts and festivals, with large audiences of paying customers, who had not necessarily had any music lessons. Composers of the Romantic Era, like Elgar, showed the world that there should be "no segregation of musical tastes" and that the "purpose was to write music that was to be heard".

Nationalism 

During the Romantic period, music often took on a much more nationalistic purpose. Composers composed with a distinct sound that represented their home country and traditions. For example, Jean Sibelius' Finlandia has been interpreted to represent the rising nation of Finland, which would someday gain independence from Russian control. Frédéric Chopin was one of the first composers to incorporate nationalistic elements into his compositions. Joseph Machlis states, "Poland's struggle for freedom from tsarist rule aroused the national poet in Poland. … Examples of musical nationalism abound in the output of the romantic era. The folk idiom is prominent in the Mazurkas of Chopin". His mazurkas and polonaises are particularly notable for their use of nationalistic rhythms. Moreover, "During World War II the Nazis forbade the playing of … Chopin's Polonaises in Warsaw because of the powerful symbolism residing in these works". Other composers, such as Bedřich Smetana, wrote pieces that musically described their homelands. In particular, Smetana's Vltava is a symphonic poem about the Moldau River in the modern-day Czech Republic, the second in a cycle of six nationalistic symphonic poems collectively titled Má vlast (My Homeland). Smetana also composed eight nationalist operas, all of which remain in the repertory. They established him as the first Czech nationalist composer as well as the most important Czech opera composer of the generation who came to prominence in the 1860s.

See also

 History of music
 List of Romantic-era composers
 Neoromanticism (music)

References

Further reading

External links
 Music of the Romantic Era
 The Romantic Era
 Era on line

 
19th century in music